Zameen Aasman (Urdu Punjabi Double version ) is a 1994 Pakistani drama film action film.

The film is directed by Hasnain  and produced by Agha Hussaini and stars Nadeem, Sultan Rahi, Saima, Izhar Qazi, Madiha Shah.

Cast

 Nadeem
 Sultan Rahi
 Saima
 Reema Khan
 Izhar Qazi
 Madiha Shah
 Sabeetha Perera
 Shiva Shrestha
 Umer Shareef
 Nargis
 Humayun Qureshi
 Bahar Begum
 Zahir Shah
 Adeeb
 Altaf Khan
 Shafqat Cheema
 Majeed Zarif
 Seema
 Qavi Khan

Track list
The soundtrack was composed by the musician M Ashraf, with lyrics by Khawaja Pervez and sung by Noor Jehan, Humaira Channa.

References

Pakistani action drama films
1990s action drama films
1994 films
Punjabi-language Pakistani films
1990s Punjabi-language films
1994 drama films